Arron Patrick (born 14 March 1987 in Grimsby, England) is an English footballer.

Career

College and amateur
Patrick played four years of college soccer at Bethel College between 2006 and 2009.

Professional
Patrick played with USL PDL club Cascade Surge in 2008 and 2009, and later signed professionally with USL Pro club Wilmington Hammerheads on 12 April 2013.

References

External links
 USL profile

1987 births
Living people
English footballers
English expatriate footballers
Cascade Surge players
Wilmington Hammerheads FC players
Expatriate soccer players in the United States
USL League Two players
USL Championship players
Association football midfielders
English expatriate sportspeople in the United States